Harr is a surname. Notable people with the surname include:

Burke Harr (born 1971), American politician
Harry R. Harr (1921–1945), United States army soldier and Medal of Honor recipient
Jonathan Harr, American writer
Karl Erik Harr (born 1940), Norwegian artist and writer
Karl G. Harr, Jr. (1922–2002), United States National Security Advisor
L. T. Harr, American football coach
Thorbjørn Harr (born 1974), Norwegian actor

See also
Haar (fog)
Hárr, alternative name for Odin